Tallawarra Power Station is a  combined cycle natural gas power station in the city of Wollongong, New South Wales, Australia.  Owned and operated by EnergyAustralia, the station is the first of its type in New South Wales and produces electricity for the state during periods of high demand.  It is located on the western shore of Lake Illawarra in the suburb of Yallah.

It uses many of the previous power station's structures including the cooling system channels from Lake Illawarra. The power station is connected to the state grid via a 132kV switching station maintained by Endeavour Energy (Previously known as Integral Energy).

TRUenergy has also indicated that an additional power plant is being considered for the site, to be known as Tallawarra B.

History
Tallawarra originally operated as a coal-fired power station beginning in 1954 and reaching full operation by 1961. 'A' station had four  Thomson-Houston 2 stage (HP+LP) turbo generators. In 1960 "B" station was built having two  English Electric 3-stage turbo generators (No. 5+6). The generators were hydrogen-cooled but didn't have any stator water cooling. The station closed in 1989, and stood abandoned by the foreshore of Lake Illawarra. It was demolished over a ten-year period.

In early 2003 the site was sold by Pacific Power to TRUenergy (then known as TXU) and construction of the gas-fired combined cycle plant began in November 2006. A unique feature is the waste heat boiler with a super heater and two reheater sections for the IP and LP stages of the turbine. Overall thermal efficiency is 60%. It was opened by the NSW Premier Nathan Rees on 18 March 2009.

See also

List of power stations in New South Wales

References

Natural gas-fired power stations in New South Wales
Buildings and structures in Wollongong
Energy infrastructure completed in 2009
2009 establishments in Australia